Andriy Atanasovich Melnyk (12 December 1890 – 1 November 1964) was a Ukrainian military and political leader.

Life
Melnyk was born near Drohobych, Halychyna, into a peasant family. Between 1912 and 1914 he studied at the Higher School of Agriculture in Vienna. With the outbreak of the First World War, Melnyk served as an officer in the Austro-Hungarian army as a volunteer commanding a company of the Ukrainian Sich Riflemen. Due to his kind demeanor, he was referred to affectionately as "Lord Melnyk" by fellow Ukrainian and Austrian officers, who felt that he embodied the English concept of a gentleman, which at that time had been an ideal in Central Europe. Melnyk was taken prisoner by the Russians in 1916. In captivity, Melnyk became a close associate of Yevhen Konovalets and joined the Ukrainian independence movement.

During the Ukrainian–Soviet War of 1917-1921 Melnyk supported Symon Petliura and was promoted to the rank of colonel in the Ukrainian People's Republic army. Together with Yevhen Konovalets, Melnyk and several others founded the Organization of Ukrainian Nationalists (OUN) in 1929. Between 1924 and 1928 Melnyk was imprisoned for terrorist activities by the Polish government. During the 1930s, however, his career was much more subdued than those of his colleagues. He basically retired from politics, refrained from terrorist activities and worked as an engineer and as the director of forests on the huge estates of the Metropolitan of the Ukrainian Greek Catholic Church, Andrey Sheptytsky. More friendly to the Church than any of his associates (the Organization of Ukrainian Nationalists was generally anti-clerical), Melnyk even became the chairman of Orlo, the Galician Catholic youth organization that was regarded as anti-Nationalist by many OUN members.

After the assassination of OUN leader Konovalets in 1938, the principal OUN leadership abroad could not choose a leader from amongst themselves and therefore asked Melnyk to become leader of OUN in 1939. He was chosen by the leadership in part because of the hope for more moderate and pragmatic leadership and due to the desire to repair strained ties with the Catholic Church. The group that had chosen Melnyk as their leader admired aspects of Benito Mussolini's fascism but condemned Nazism. In 1940 a more radical faction of the OUN, led by Stepan Bandera and based in Ukraine, broke away from the OUN led by Melnyk in exile. The two rival organizations became known as Melnykites (Melnykivtsi) and Banderites (Banderivtsi).

After 1938 Melnyk and Bandera were recruited into the Nazi Germany military intelligence Abwehr for espionage, counter-espionage and sabotage. The Abwehr goal was to run diversion activities after Germany's planned attack on the Soviet Union. Melnik was given the code name 'Consul I'. This information is part of the testimony that Abwehr Colonel Erwin Stolze gave on 25 December 1945 and submitted to the Nuremberg trials, with a request that it be admitted as evidence.

After the June 1941 German  invasion of the Soviet Union, Melnyk declared his own independent Ukrainian government in Rivne, competing with Bandera supporters for influence in western Ukraine. Initially, Melnyk's more conservative and moderate supporters enjoyed support against Bandera's radicals both from the Ukrainian Greek Catholic Church and from German military authorities. However, his position was contradictory. A conservative Catholic who maintained the officer's personal code of honor, Melnyk was at odds with aspects of the ideology of his own organization. His reluctance to assert dominance or to engage in a ruthless pursuit of power disadvantaged him versus his younger and more violent rivals in the Bandera camp. Many of Melnyk's close associates were killed by Bandera's Ukrainian Insurgent Army between 1941 and 1944 and Bandera's movement came to dominate the Ukrainian nationalist political milieu in most of western Ukraine. In 1944 Melnyk was briefly imprisoned by the Gestapo during a crackdown against the Ukrainian independence movement.

After the war, Melnyk escaped to the West and lived in Luxembourg, West Germany, and Canada. He remained politically active and headed a number of Ukrainian émigré organizations. He died in Clervaux, Luxembourg, at the age of 73, and was buried at Bonnevoie cemetery,  Luxembourg.

In late 2006, the Lviv city administration announced the future transfer of the tombs of Andriy Melnyk, Yevhen Konovalets, Stepan Bandera and other key leaders of the OUN and UPA to a new area of Lychakivskiy Cemetery specifically dedicated to the Ukrainian national-liberation struggle. However this was not implemented.

See also
History of Ukraine
Stepan Bandera

Notes

References
Andrii Melnyk biography in Encyclopaedia of Ukraine
"The History we don't know. Or don't care to know?" [Історія, якої не знаємо. Чи не хочемо знати?], available online

1890 births
1964 deaths
Austro-Hungarian military personnel of World War I
Organization of Ukrainian Nationalists politicians
People from Lviv Oblast
People from the Kingdom of Galicia and Lodomeria
Sachsenhausen concentration camp survivors
Ukrainian Austro-Hungarians
Ukrainian collaborators with Nazi Germany
Ukrainian military personnel
Ukrainian nationalists
Ukrainian people of World War I
Ukrainian people of World War II
Ukrainian politicians before 1991
Ukrainian refugees
Ukrainian Eastern Catholics